Holly Payne  (born 11 July 1991) is an English international field hockey player who plays as a midfielder for Great Britain.

She plays club hockey in the Investec Women's Hockey League Premier Division for Surbiton.

Payne has also played for Uni of Birmingham and Leicester.

References

1991 births
Living people
English female field hockey players
Surbiton Hockey Club players
Women's England Hockey League players
University of Birmingham Hockey Club players